Rose Akol Okullu, commonly known as Rose Akol (born 27 November 1964), is a Ugandan accountant and politician. She was appointed as Minister of Internal Affairs on 16 November 2015. She assumed office following confirmation by the Parliament of Uganda. She is also an elected member of parliament as Bukedea District's women's representative.

Background and education
She was born in Bukedea District, and attended Ngora High School. She holds a Masters in Business Administration degree in finance and accounting, awarded in 2004 by the Makerere University Business School.

Work experience
She started her career in 1989 as an assistant accountant at the Uganda Export Promotions Council, serving in that position until 1990. From 1990 until 1993, she served as an accountant at the Karamoja Development Agency. From 1994 until 2000, she was a senior internal auditor at the Uganda Airlines Corporation. From 2003 until 2006, she served as the head of internal audit at the Joint Clinical Research Centre. She concurrently served as an accountant at the East African Airlines. In 2006, she entered elective parliamentary politics by winning the seat of Bukedea District woman's representative. She was re-elected in 2011.

Personal details
Rose Akol is married. She is of the Roman Catholic faith. She is a member of the National Resistance Movement political party.

See also
 Teso sub-region

References

External links
 Website of the Parliament of Uganda 

1964 births
Living people
Makerere University Business School alumni
Government ministers of Uganda
People from Bukedea District
Itesot people
People from Eastern Region, Uganda
People from Teso sub-region
Ugandan accountants
Women accountants
21st-century Ugandan women politicians
21st-century Ugandan politicians
Female interior ministers
Women government ministers of Uganda